Vinnytsia Oblast is subdivided into districts (raions) which are subdivided into territorial communities (hromadas).

Current

On 18 July 2020, the number of districts was reduced to six. These are:
 Haisyn (Гайсинський район), the center is in the city of Haisyn;
 Khmilnyk (Хмільницький район), the center is in the city of Khmilnyk;
 Mohyliv-Podilskyi (Могилів-Подільський район), the center is in the city of Mohyliv-Podilskyi;
 Tulchyn (Тульчинський район), the center is in the city of Tulchyn;
 Vinnytsia (Вінницький район), the center is in the city of Vinnytsia;
 Zhmerynka (Жмеринський район), the center is in the city of Zhmerynka.

Administrative divisions until 2020

Before 2020, Vinnytsia Oblast was subdivided into 33 regions: 27 districts (raions) and 6 city municipalities (mis'krada or misto), officially known as territories governed by city councils.
Cities under the oblast's jurisdiction:
Vinnytsia (Вінниця), the administrative center of the oblast 
Khmilnyk (Хмільник)
Koziatyn Municipality 
Cities under the city's jurisdiction:
Koziatyn (Козятин)
Urban-type settlements under the city's jurisdiction:
Zaliznychne (Залізничне)
Ladyzhyn Municipality 
Cities under the city's jurisdiction:
Ladyzhyn (Ладижин)
Mohyliv-Podilskyi Municipality
Cities under the city's jurisdiction:
Mohyliv-Podilskyi (Могилів-Подільський)
 Zhmerynka (Жмеринка)
Districts (raions):
Bar (Барський район)
Cities under the district's jurisdiction:
Bar (Бар)
Urban-type settlements under the district's jurisdiction:
Kopaihorod (Копайгород)
Bershad (Бершадський район)
Cities under the district's jurisdiction:
Bershad (Бершадь)
Chechelnyk (Чечельницький район)
Urban-type settlements under the district's jurisdiction:
Chechelnyk (Чечельник)
Chernivtsi (Чернівецький район)
Urban-type settlements under the district's jurisdiction:
Chernivtsi (Чернівці)
Haisyn (Гайсинський район)
Cities under the district's jurisdiction:
Haisyn (Гайсин)
Illintsi (Іллінецький район)
Cities under the district's jurisdiction:
Illintsi (Іллінці)
Urban-type settlements under the district's jurisdiction:
Dashiv (Дашів)
Kalynivka (Калинівський район)
Cities under the district's jurisdiction:
Kalynivka (Калинівка)
Khmilnyk (Хмільницький район)
Koziatyn (Козятинський район)
Urban-type settlements under the district's jurisdiction:
Brodetske (Бродецьке)
Hlukhivtsi (Глухівці)
Kryzhopil (Крижопільський район)
Urban-type settlements under the district's jurisdiction:
Kryzhopil (Крижопіль)
Lypovets (Липовецький район)
Cities under the district's jurisdiction:
Lypovets (Липовець)
Urban-type settlements under the district's jurisdiction:
Turbiv (Турбів)
Lityn (Літинський район)
Urban-type settlements under the district's jurisdiction:
Lityn (Літин)
Mohyliv-Podilskyi (Могилів-Подільський район)
Urban-type settlements under the district's jurisdiction:
Vendychany (Вендичани)
Murovani Kurylivtsi (Мурованокуриловецький район)
Urban-type settlements under the district's jurisdiction:
Murovani Kurylivtsi (Муровані Курилівці)
Nemyriv (Немирівський район)
Cities under the district's jurisdiction:
Nemyriv (Немирів)
Urban-type settlements under the district's jurisdiction:
Bratslav (Брацлав)
Sytkivtsi (Ситківці)
Orativ (Оратівський район)
Urban-type settlements under the district's jurisdiction:
Orativ (Оратів)
Pishchanka (Піщанський район)
Urban-type settlements under the district's jurisdiction:
Pishchanka (Піщанка)
Rudnytsia (Рудниця)
Pohrebyshche (Погребищенський район)
Cities under the district's jurisdiction:
Pohrebyshche (Погребище)
Sharhorod (Шаргородський район)
Cities under the district's jurisdiction:
Sharhorod (Шаргород)
Teplyk (Теплицький район)
Urban-type settlements under the district's jurisdiction:
Teplyk (Теплик)
Tomashpil (Томашпільський район)
Urban-type settlements under the district's jurisdiction:
Tomashpil (Томашпіль)
Vapniarka (Вапнярка)
Trostianets (Тростянецький район)
Urban-type settlements under the district's jurisdiction:
Trostianets (Тростянець)
Tulchyn (Тульчинський район)
Cities under the district's jurisdiction:
Tulchyn (Тульчин)
Urban-type settlements under the district's jurisdiction:
Kyrnasivka (Кирнасівка)
Shpykiv (Шпиків)
Tyvriv (Тиврівський район)
Cities under the district's jurisdiction:
Hnivan (Гнівань)
Urban-type settlements under the district's jurisdiction:
Sutysky (Сутиски)
Tyvriv (Тиврів)
Vinnytsia (Вінницький район)
Urban-type settlements under the district's jurisdiction:
Desna (Десна)
Stryzhavka (Стрижавка)
Voronovytsia (Вороновиця)
Yampil (Ямпільський район)
Cities under the district's jurisdiction:
Yampil (Ямпіль)
Zhmerynka (Жмеринський район)
Urban-type settlements under the district's jurisdiction:
Brailiv (Браїлів)

References

Vinnytsia
Vinnytsia Oblast